The Red Hills Lake County AVA is an American Viticultural Area located in Lake County, California. The wine region lies along the southwestern shores of Clear Lake, separating Excelsior Valley to the east from Big Valley to the west. The hills lie at the foot of Mount Konocti, a volcano which last erupted 11,000 years ago, but which is still regarded as active.

References

American Viticultural Areas
American Viticultural Areas of California
Geography of Lake County, California
2004 establishments in California